The Golden Book-Owl (De Gouden Boekenuil) is a Belgian prize for original Dutch language literature. Originally it was named Golden Owl (De Gouden Uil). It has been awarded annually since 1995.

Development
It has changed categories several times during the years. For the first five years it consisted of three columns: Fiction, non-fiction and children and youth books. As for 2000 to 2008 the non-fiction category was replaced by an audience award. In 2009 and 2010 it had even four categories: Literature, Youth Literature, Audience and Youth Audience. Since 2012 it is reduced to grown up literature prizes. The winner gets 25,000 euro and a work of art, the winner of the 100 reader's prize gets 2,500 euro  and a MontBlanc pen.

Laureates

1995: 
Fiction: Adriaan van Dis - Indische Duinen
Children and youth books: Anne Provoost - Vallen
Non-fiction: Jeroen Brouwers - Vlaamse Leeuwen
1996
Fiction: Guido van Heulendonk - Paarden Zijn Ook Varkens
Children and youth books: Anton Quintana - Het Boek van Bod Pa
Non-fiction: Joris van Parys - Frans Masereel, een biografie
1997
Fiction: A.F.Th. van der Heijden - Het Hof van Barmhartigheid & Onder het Plaveisel het Moeras
Children and youth books: Joke van Leeuwen - Iep!
Non-fiction: Elsbeth Etty - Liefde is Heel het leven
1998
Fiction: Marcel Möring - In Babylon
Children and youth books: Peter van Gestel - Mariken
Non-fiction: Leonard Blussé - Bitters Bruid
1999
Fiction: Geerten Meijsing - Tussen Mes en Keel
Children and youth books: Rita Verschuur - Jubeltenen
Non-fiction: Gerrit Komrij - In Liefde Bloeyende
2000
Literature Prize: Peter Verhelst - Tongkat
Youth Literature Prize: Toon Tellegen - De Genezing van de Krekel
Audience Award: Tom Lanoye - Zwarte Tranen
2001
Literature Prize: Jeroen Brouwers - Geheime kamers
Youth Literature Prize: Bart Moeyaert, Gerda Dendooven and Filip Bral - Luna van de boom
Audience Award: Jeroen Brouwers - Geheime kamers
2002
Literature Prize: Arnon Grunberg - De Mensheid Zij Geprezen
Youth Literature Prize: Bas Haring - Kaas & de evolutietheorie
Audience Award: Peter Verhelst - Memoires van een Luipaard
2003
Literature Prize: Tom Lanoye - Boze Tongen 
Youth Literature Prize: Floortje Zwigtman - Wolfsroedel
Audience Award: Tom Lanoye - Boze Tongen
2004
Literature Prize: Hafid Bouazza - Paravion
Youth Literature Prize: Martha Heesen - Toen Faas niet thuiskwam
Audience Award: Chris De Stoop - Zij kwamen uit het Oosten
2005
Literature Prize: Frank Westerman - El Negro en ik
Youth Literature Prize: Guus Kuijer - Het boek van alle dingen
Audience Award: Patricia De Martelaere - Het onverwachte antwoord
2006
Literature Prize: Henk van Woerden - Ultramarijn
Youth Literature Prize: Floortje Zwigtman - Schijnbewegingen
Audience Award: Stefan Brijs - De engelenmaker
2007
Literature Prize: Arnon Grunberg - Tirza
Youth Literature Prize: Marjolijn Hof - Een kleine kans
Audience Award:  Dimitri Verhulst - De helaasheid der dingen
2008
Literature Prize: Marc Reugebrink - Het Grote Uitstel
Youth Literature Prize: Sabien Clement, Mieke Versyp and Pieter Gaudesaboos - Linus
Audience Award: Jeroen Brouwers - Datumloze dagen
2009
Literature Prize: Robert Vuijsje - Alleen maar nette mensen
Youth Literature Prize: Peter Verhelst - Het geheim van de keel van de nachtegaal (ill. Carll Cneut)
Audience Award: Pia de Jong - Lange dagen
Audience Youth Award: Els Beerten- Allemaal willen we de hemel
2010
Literature Prize: Cees Nooteboom - 's Nachts komen de vossen
Youth Literature Prize: Ditte Merle - Wild Verliefd
Audience Award: Tom Lanoye - Sprakeloos
Audience Youth Award: Marita de Sterck- De hondeneters
2011
 no awards ceremony.
2012 now renamed as 'De Gouden Boekenuil'
Literature Prize: David Pefko - Het voorseizoen
Audience Award: Stephan Enter - Grip
2013
Literature Prize: Oek de Jong - Pier en oceaan
Audience Award: Tommy Wieringa - Dit zijn de namen
2014
Literature Prize: Joost de Vries - De republiek
Audience Award: Stefan Hertmans - Oorlog en terpentijn

References

External links
 

Awards established in 1995
Fiction awards
Belgian literature